Softly is the fourteenth studio album by Japanese singer-songwriter Tatsuro Yamashita, released on June 22, 2022. It has been certified platinum by RIAJ in July 2022, for sales of over 250,000 copies.

Overview
Softly was Yamashita's first new studio album in 11 years since Ray of Hope in August 2011. In addition to single songs such as "Hikari to Kimi e no Requiem", "Cheer Up! The Summer", "Reborn", "Mirai no Theme", and "Recipe", the album contains 15 songs including "Lehua, My Love" and "Shining from the Inside", which were previously used as CM songs. All the songs that have already been released will have new mixes. The title "Softly" expresses Tatsuro Yamashita's earnest desire to gently and softly wrap up this turbulent era with music.

On April 1, 2022, a special site and an announcement trailer video was made on YouTube.

Artwork
The jacket uses a portrait of Yamashita drawn by Mari Yamazaki, a manga artist known for Thermae Romae. Yamazaki had studied painting in Italy, majoring in oil painting and art history, and had always dreamt of painting a portrait.

Track listing

Standard edition

Limited edition bonus disc

LP edition

Charts

Weekly charts

Monthly charts

Year-end charts

Release history

References

2022 albums
Tatsuro Yamashita albums